Kutao is a station on Line 11 of the Qingdao Metro. It opened on 23 April 2018.

Gallery

References

Qingdao Metro stations
Railway stations in China opened in 2018